Zhou Dadi (born 18 February 1996 in Lankao) is a Chinese professional footballer who currently plays for China League One club Sichuan Jiuniu.

Club career
Zhou Dadi joined Chinese Super League side Changchun Yatai's youth academy in 2006. He went to Portugal following Chinese Football Association 500.com Stars Project and joined Casa Pia youth team system in 2012. He was promoted to Changchun Yatai's first squad in July 2014. On 24 April 2016, he made his professional debut for Yatai in a 1-3 defeat against Shanghai SIPG at home, coming on as a substitute for Du Zhenyu in the 80th minute. On 15 August 2018, he scored his first senior goal in a 3–1 away win over Beijing Renhe.

On 20 July 2021, Zhou joined China League One club Heilongjiang Ice City on loan.

Career statistics
Statistics accurate as of match played 31 December 2020.

Honours

Club
Changchun Yatai
 China League One: 2020

References

External links
 

1996 births
Living people
Chinese footballers
Footballers from Henan
Changchun Yatai F.C. players
China League One players
Chinese Super League players
Association football midfielders
People from Lankao County